Mike Egener (born September 26, 1984) is a Canadian former professional ice hockey defenceman. He was drafted 34th overall by the Tampa Bay Lightning in the 2003 NHL Entry Draft after a four-year junior career with the Calgary Hitmen.

Career statistics

Regular season and playoffs

International

External links

1984 births
Living people
Calgary Hitmen players
Canadian ice hockey defencemen
Coventry Blaze players
EfB Ishockey players
Florida Everblades players
IF Björklöven players
Johnstown Chiefs players
Mississippi Sea Wolves players
Norfolk Admirals players
Ontario Reign (ECHL) players
People with Guillain–Barré syndrome
Springfield Falcons players
Tampa Bay Lightning draft picks
Canadian expatriate ice hockey players in England
Canadian expatriate ice hockey players in Denmark
Canadian expatriate ice hockey players in Sweden
Canadian expatriate ice hockey players in the United States